Pen y Boncyn Trefeilw is a subsidiary summit of Cyrniau Nod in north east Wales. It forms a part of the Berwyn range called the Hirnantau. It has two tops: Stac Rhos and Pen y Cerrig Duon. Pen y Cerrig Duon is now listed as a deleted Nuttall due to re-surveying.

The views from the summit are extensive, if unremarkable due to the featureless, flat moorland surroundings.  The summit is marked by a small cairn, is which located only a few metres from a track road that continues on to the pass between Cyrniau Nod and Y Groes Fagl.

References

Llangywer
Mountains and hills of Gwynedd
Mountains and hills of Snowdonia
Hewitts of Wales
Nuttalls